Edris is an Eritrean surname that may refer to

Given name 
Edris Eckhardt (1905–1998), American artist associated with the Cleveland School
Edris Fetisleam (born 1999), Romanian tennis player
Edris Rice-Wray Carson (1904–1990), American birth control activist
Edris Saint-Amand (1918–2004), Haitian novelist

Family name 
Amina Edris, New Zealand operatic soprano
Muktar Edris (born 1994), Ethiopian professional long-distance runner
Zakaria Edris, Malaysian politician
Tigrinya-language names
Arabic-language names
Surnames of Eritrean origin
Welsh feminine given names
English feminine given names